This is a list of the 135 municipalities in the province of Castelló (Castellón in Castillian Spanish) in the Valencian Country, Spain, with their populations and the comercas (comerques) in which they are situated.

References

See also
Geography of Spain
List of Spanish cities

Municipalities in the Province of Castello
Castello